The 54th Primetime Emmy Awards were held on Sunday, September 22, 2002. Nominations were announced July 22, 2002. The ceremony was hosted by Conan O'Brien and was broadcast on NBC. Two networks, FX and VH1, received their first major nominations this year. The program America: A Tribute to Heroes was simulcast on every major network and, therefore, is not designated with one below.

After four nominations during its first seven seasons, Friends won Outstanding Comedy Series without a directing or a writing nomination. Everybody Loves Raymond led all comedies with nine major nominations and three major wins. Meanwhile, after eight consecutive nominations (including five consecutive wins for its first five seasons), Frasier was excluded from the Outstanding Comedy Series nomination for the first time. It would not be nominated for its final two seasons either.

For the third straight year, the drama field was conquered by The West Wing. In addition to winning its third consecutive trophy for Outstanding Drama Series, The West Wing achieved a milestone when it became the third series (all dramas) to gain nine acting nominations for its main cast members. This tied the mark set by Hill Street Blues in 1982 and later matched by L.A. Law in 1989. Game of Thrones would also match this in 2019. The West Wing also set a record with twelve total acting nominations when including the guest category, a category that existed for L.A. Law, but was not available for Hill Street Blues during its second season (1981–82) of nine acting nominations. Overall, The West Wing led all series in major nominations and wins with thirteen and four.

In addition, Stockard Channing joined an exclusive club of actors that have won two awards in one ceremony for different roles. Furthermore, Michael Chiklis became the second actor in a cable network series to win for Outstanding Lead Actor in a Drama Series (after James Gandolfini for The Sopranos in 2000 and 2001) for his performance as Vic Mackey in The Shield whilst becoming FX's first ever acting win.

Winners and nominees
Winners are listed first and highlighted in bold:

Programs

Acting

Lead performances

Supporting performances
{| class="wikitable"
|+ 
|-
| style="vertical-align:top;" width="50%" | 
 Brad Garrett – Everybody Loves Raymond as Robert Barone (CBS)
 Peter Boyle – Everybody Loves Raymond as Frank Barone (CBS)
 Bryan Cranston – Malcolm in the Middle as Hal (Fox)
 Sean Hayes – Will & Grace as Jack McFarland (NBC)
 David Hyde Pierce – Frasier as Dr. Niles Crane (NBC)
| style="vertical-align:top;" width="50%" | 
 Doris Roberts – Everybody Loves Raymond as Marie Barone (CBS)
 Kim Cattrall – Sex and the City as Samantha Jones (HBO)
 Wendie Malick – Just Shoot Me! as Nina Van Horn (NBC)
 Megan Mullally – Will & Grace as Karen Walker (NBC)
 Cynthia Nixon – Sex and the City as Miranda Hobbes (HBO)
|-
| style="vertical-align:top;" width="50%" | 
 John Spencer – The West Wing as Leo McGarry (NBC)
 Victor Garber – Alias as Jack Bristow (ABC)
 Dulé Hill – The West Wing as Charlie Young (NBC)
 Freddy Rodriguez – Six Feet Under as Federico Diaz (HBO)
 Richard Schiff – The West Wing as Toby Ziegler (NBC)
 Bradley Whitford – The West Wing as Josh Lyman (NBC)
| style="vertical-align:top;" width="50%" | 
 Stockard Channing – The West Wing as First Lady Abbey Bartlet (NBC)
 Lauren Ambrose – Six Feet Under as Claire Fisher (HBO)
 Tyne Daly – Judging Amy as Maxine Gray (CBS)
 Janel Moloney – The West Wing as Donna Moss (NBC)
 Mary-Louise Parker – The West Wing as Amy Gardner (NBC)
|-
| style="vertical-align:top;" width="50%" | 
 Michael Moriarty – James Dean as Winton Dean (TNT)
 Alec Baldwin – Path to War as Robert McNamara (HBO)
 Jim Broadbent – The Gathering Storm as Desmond Morton (HBO)
 Don Cheadle – Things Behind the Sun as Chuck (Showtime)
 Jon Voight – Uprising as Jürgen Stroop (NBC)
| style="vertical-align:top;" width="50%" | 
 Stockard Channing – The Matthew Shepard Story as Judy Shepard (NBC)
 Joan Allen – The Mists of Avalon as Morgause (TNT)' Anjelica Huston – The Mists of Avalon as Viviane (TNT)
 Diana Rigg – Victoria & Albert as Louise Lehzen (A&E)
 Sissy Spacek – Last Call as Zelda Fitzgerald (Showtime)
|}

Directing

Writing

Most major nominations
By network 
 NBC – 47
 HBO – 38
 CBS – 17
 Fox – 12

By program
 The West Wing (NBC) – 13
 Six Feet Under (HBO) – 11
 Everybody Loves Raymond (CBS) – 9
 Sex and the City (HBO) / Will & Grace (NBC) – 7
 The Gathering Storm (HBO) – 6

Most major awards
By network 
 NBC – 10
 HBO – 8
 CBS – 4
 Fox – 3

By program
 The West Wing (NBC) – 4
 Everybody Loves Raymond (CBS) / The Gathering Storm'' (HBO) – 3

Notes

In Memoriam

 Rod Steiger
 James Gregory
 Kim Hunter
 Roy Huggins
 LaWanda Page
 Chick Hearn
 Rosemary Clooney
 Paul Tripp
 Peter Matz
 Jack Buck
 Avery Schreiber
 Dave Wilson
 Matt Robinson Jr.
 Howard K. Smith
 Dudley Moore
 Chuck Jones
 Dick Schaap
 Reginald Rose
 Pat Weaver
 Ted Demme
 Robert Urich
 Eileen Heckart
 John Frankenheimer
 Lew Wasserman
 Milton Berle

References

External links
 Emmys.com list of 2002 Nominees & Winners
 

054
2002 television awards
2002 in Los Angeles
September 2002 events in the United States